SS Graciosa was a small freighter built during the First World War for James C. Gould and Co. under the name of Greltoria. Completed in 1917, she was sold while fitting out to the Bromport Steamship Co. and renamed Rabymere for use on their West African routes. The ship was sold to the Moss Steamship Co. in 1923 when the Lever Brothers closed down Bromport and sold off its ships. Moss renamed the ship as Edfou before selling it to Skibs A/S Fjeld in 1929 who renamed it Graciosa. During the Second World War, the ship was badly damaged during the Bombay Docks Explosion in early 1944 and was declared a constructive total loss and subsequently scrapped.

Description 
She had a vertical triple-expansion steam engine driving a single screw propeller, and the engine was rated at a total of 159 nominal horsepower and produced .

Construction and career 
Graciosa was laid down by the Clyde Shipbuilding and Engineering Co. at its shipyard in Port Glasgow, Scotland, launched on 24 October 1916. Ordered by James C. Gould  and Co., the ship was sold to the Levers Brothers' newly formed Bromport Steamship Co. while fitting out. She was completed on 2 February 1917 and named Rabymere. 

Graciosa was scrapped in Bombay (now Mumbai), British India, after having been declared a constructive total loss.

References

Bibliography

 

Ships built on the River Clyde
Steamships of the United Kingdom
Steamships of Norway
Maritime incidents in April 1944
World War II merchant ships of Norway
1916 ships
Ships of the Bromport Steamship Company